This is a timeline documenting the events of heavy metal music in the year 1993.

Newly formed bands
 Abigor
Ablaze My Sorrow
Acid King
Aeternus
Anata 
Apocalyptica
Arckanum
Artension
Aura Noir
Avalanch
Bestial Warlust
Botch 
Breach
Burst 
Capharnaum
 Children of Bodom (as Inearthed)
Cirith Gorgor
Cirrha Niva
Coal Chamber
 Dark Funeral
Dark Moor
Darkwoods My Betrothed
Deeds of Flesh
Defeated Sanity
 Demoniac
Diabolical Masquerade
Dimmu Borgir
The Donnas
Dub War
Einherjer
 Electric Wizard
Enthroned
Extol
Filter 
Forgotten Silence
Funeral Mist 
Gehenna 
God Lives Underwater
Grip Inc.
 HammerFall
Hanzel und Gretyl
Hecate Enthroned
Horna
Keep of Kalessin
 Korn
Korpiklaani
Lacrimas Profundere
 Limbonic Art
Madder Mortem
Manes
Mass Hysteria
 Melechesh
Midvinter
Misery Loves Co.
 Mournful Congregation
 Mushroomhead
Nagelfar
Nazxul
 Nile
Nocte Obducta
Nothingface 
Old Man's Child
Orphanage 
Panzerchrist
Papa Roach
Pegazus
Pist.On
 Rhapsody of Fire
Rotten Sound
 Sacrificium
Sear Bliss
Setherial
Sheavy
Six Feet Under
Slash's Snakepit
Spastic Ink
Storm 
Strongarm
Summoning
Superjoint
Taake
 Theatre of Tragedy
Thou Art Lord
To/Die/For
Tsjuder
Tulus
 Ulver
Unholy Grave
Ved Buens Ende
Vlad Tepes
Voodoocult
Waylander
Zao

Reformed bands
 Atheist
 Cream- for a few shows
 Dio
 Dokken

Albums

 Accept – Objection Overruled
 Aerosmith – Get a Grip
 Alleycat Scratch – Deadboys in Trash City
 Altered State – :[dos]:
 Aggressor – Procreate the Petrifactions
 Amorphis - Privilege of Evil (EP)
 Anacrusis – Screams and Whispers
 Anathema – Serenades
 Angra – Angels Cry
 Annihilator – Set the World on Fire
 Anthrax – Sound of White Noise
 April Wine - Attitude
 Arcade – Arcade
 At the Gates - With Fear I Kiss the Burning Darkness
 Atheist – Elements
 Bad Brains – Rise
 Bakers Pink – Bakers Pink
 Believer – Dimensions
 Beherit – Drawing Down the Moon
 Benediction - Transcend the Rubicon
 Beowülf – Un-Sentimental
 Blue Murder – Nothin but Trouble
 Brutality - Screams of Anguish
 Brutal Truth - Perpetual Conversion (EP)
 Bulletboys – Za-Za
 Burzum – Aske (EP)
 Burzum – Det som engang var
 Cancer - The Sins of Mankind
 Cannibal Corpse – Hammer Smashed Face (EP)
 Carcass – Heartwork
 Cathedral - The Ethereal Mirror
 Cherry St. – Squeeze it Dry
 Child'ƨ Play – Long Way
 Clawfinger – Deaf Dumb Blind
 Comecon - Converging Conspiracies
 Conception – Parallel Minds
 Coverdale/Page – Coverdale/Page
 Craig Goldy – Insufficient Therapy
 Cro-Mags – Near Death Experience
 Crowbar – Crowbar
 Cynic – Focus
 Damaged - Do Not Spit
 Danzig – Thrall-Demonsweatlive
 Darkthrone – Under a Funeral Moon
 Dark Tranquillity – Skydancer
 Death – Individual Thought Patterns
 Deceased - 13 Frightened Souls (EP)
 Deep Purple – The Battle Rages On
 Def Leppard – Retro Active (compilation)
 Deliverance – Learn
 Desultory - Into Eternity
 Dio – Strange Highways (Europe release)
 Disincarnate – Dreams of the Carrion Kind
 Dismember - Indecent & Obscene
 Dissection – The Somberlain
 Dream Theater - Live at the Marquee
 Earth (American band) - Earth 2 (album) Earthshaker – Real Earthshaker – Yesterday & Tomorrow Edge of Sanity - The Spectral Sorrows Entombed – Wolverine Blues Entombed – Hollowman (EP)
 Enuff Z'nuff -  Animals with Human Intelligence  
 Europe – 1982–1992 (compilation)
 Every Mothers Nightmare – Wake up Screaming Eyehategod – Take as Needed for Pain Fight – War of Words Fishbone - Give a Monkey a Brain and He'll Swear He's the Center of the Universe Gamma Ray – Insanity and Genius The Gathering - Almost a Dance Genitorturers - 120 Days of Genitorture Gorguts - The Erosion of Sanity Grave - ...And Here I Die... Satisfied (EP)
 Guns N' Roses - The Spaghetti Incident? Helloween – Chameleon Hypocrisy - Osculum Obscenum Hypocrisy - Pleasure of Molestation (EP)
 Illdisposed - Four Depressive Seasons Immortal – Pure Holocaust Impaled Nazarene – Ugra Karma  Iron Maiden – A Real Live One (Live)
 Iron Maiden – A Real Dead One (Live)
 Iron Maiden – Live at Donington (Live)
 Judas Priest – Metal Works '73–'93 (Compilation)
 Kataklysm - The Mystical Gate of Reincarnation (EP)
 Katatonia – Dance of December Souls Kiss – Alive III (live)
 KMFDM – Angst Konkhra - Sexual Affective Disorder Krabathor - Cool Mortification Lacrimosa – Satura Life of Agony – River Runs Red Living Colour – Stain Love/Hate - Let's Rumble Macabre – Sinister Slaughter Tony MacAlpine – Madness Marduk - Those of the Unlight 
 Malevolent Creation - Stillborn Duff McKagan – Believe in Me Melvins – Houdini Mercyful Fate – In the Shadows Metal Church – Hanging in the Balance Metallica – Live Shit: Binge & Purge (live box set)
 Morbid Angel – Covenant Morgana Lefay – Knowing Just as I Morgana Lefay – The Secret Doctrine Morgoth - Odium Mortician - Mortal Massacre (EP)
 Mortification - Post Momentary Affliction Monster Magnet – Superjudge Motörhead – Bastards Mr Big – Bump Ahead My Dying Bride – Turn Loose the Swans My Dying Bride – The Thrash of Naked Limbs (EP)
 Necrophobic – The Nocturnal Silence Necrophobic – The Call (EP)
 Neurosis – Enemy of the Sun Ningen Isu – Rashōmon Nirvana - In Utero Nuclear Assault – Something Wicked Overkill – I Hear Black Pan.Thy.Monium - Khaooohs Paradise Lost – Icon Pearl Jam – Vs. Pestilence – Spheres Phantom Blue - Built to Perform Pitchshifter – Desensitized Pungent Stench - Dirty Rhymes & Psychotronic Beats (EP)
 Quiet Riot – Terrified Rage – The Missing Link Robert Plant – Fate of Nations Rotting Christ - Thy Mighty Contract Rush – Counterparts Sacred Reich – Independent Satyricon - Dark Medieval Times Savatage – Edge of Thorns Scorpions – Face the Heat Sentenced - North from Here Sepultura – Chaos A.D. Shotgun Messiah – Violent New Breed Sick of It All – Live in a World Full of Hate (live)
 Sinister – Diabolical Summoning Sinner – Respect Sleep – Sleep's Holy Mountain Smashing Pumpkins – Siamese Dream Steve Vai – Sex & Religion Suffocation - Breeding the Spawn Tad – Inhaler Tad Morose – Leaving the Past Behind Talisman – Genesis Therapy? – Hats Off to the Insane Therion - Symphony Masses: Ho Drakon Ho Megas Tool – Undertow Treponem Pal – Excess and Overdrive Type O Negative – Bloody Kisses Unanimated - In the Forest of the Dreaming Dead Uncle Slam – Will Work for Food Unleashed – Across the Open Sea Van Halen – Live: Right Here, Right Now (live)
 Vince Neil – Exposed Vio-lence – Nothing to Gain Voïvod – The Outer Limits Warrior Soul – Chill Pill Winger – Pull X Japan – Art of LifeEvents
 Accept reforms with Udo Dirkshneider on vocals for a new album and European/American tour
 After a brief hiatus, Atheist reform to record their final album, Elements'', in order to finish their third album contract to their record label. After this, the band breaks up again a year later.
 Bruce Dickinson leaves Iron Maiden. Wolfsbane's singer Blaze Bayley is chosen to replace him.
 Rob Halford of Judas Priest leaves the band to start his own project Fight
 The band Betrayer assumes the name Belphegor
 Michael Kiske of Helloween leaves the band due to personal reasons. He was replaced by Andi Deris.
 Alex Skolnick and Louie Clemente of Testament are out of the band and replaced by James Murphy on guitar and John Tempesta on drums. Skolnick later joins Savatage to replace the late Criss Oliva.
 Euronymous - guitarist and mainman of Norwegian black metal band Mayhem as well as founder and manager of record label Deathlike Silence Productions and Oslo store Helvete - was murdered on August 10, by fellow black metal musician Varg Vikernes (aka Count Grishnackh) of one-man band Burzum as well as bassist of Mayhem.
 Criss Oliva of Savatage was killed in a car crash on October 17 by a drunk driver.
 Japanese power metal band X changes their name to "X Japan".

References

1990s in heavy metal music
Metal